Bill & Ted's Excellent Adventures is an American live-action sitcom television series created by Clifton Campbell that aired on Fox from June 28 to August 9, 1992. It was based on the similarly-titled 1989 film, and is part of the Bill & Ted franchise. The series follows the misadventures of two time-traveling slackers as they travel into the distant past and future.

Overview 
After the DIC Entertainment animated series was cancelled, it was supplanted by a live action version of the same name. The series was set to air during the 1991–92 television season, but production was delayed until Bill & Ted's Bogus Journey made a profit at the box office. The series ended up airing in the summer of 1992.

Cast

Main
 Evan Richards as Bill S. Preston Esq.
 Christopher Kennedy as Ted Logan
 Rick Overton as Rufus
 Danny Breen as Mr. Keilson
 Don Lake as Mr. Preston
 Lisa Wilcox as Missy Preston
 Matt Landers as Captain Logan

Guest stars
 Diedrich Bader as Arthur (in "Nail the Conquering Hero")
 Todd McDurmont as Elvis Presley (in "Hunka Hunka Bill and Ted")
 Tom McBeath as Sheriff (in "Deja Vu")
 Arte Johnson as Albert Einstein (in "A Stand Up Guy")
 Don Ackerman as Glen Nevis (in "A Stand Up Guy")

Episodes

An unaired pilot of the series also exists.

Reception
Carole Kucharewicz of Variety, although praising the special effects, criticized the acting and ultimately gave a negative review, stating: "Taking two-dimensional teen time travelers and making a movie was a good idea and it made lots of money. Taking one-dimensional teen time travelers and making a weekly series is not a good idea and it's not a compelling enough reason for parents to let their youngsters take over the TV from 60 Minutes reruns."

References

External links
 
 
 Bill and Ted's Excellent Online Adventure

1990s American comic science fiction television series
1990s American teen sitcoms
1992 American television series debuts
1992 American television series endings
American time travel television series
Bill & Ted
English-language television shows
Fox Broadcasting Company original programming
Live action television shows based on films
Television series about teenagers
Television series by Lorimar Television
Television shows set in California
1990s American time travel television series